Sveti Petar Orehovec is a municipality in the Koprivnica-Križevci County in Croatia. According to the 2011 census, there are 4,583 inhabitants in the area.
The municipality was formed in 1993.

History
In the late 19th century and early 20th century, Sveti Petar Orehovec was part of the Bjelovar-Križevci County of the Kingdom of Croatia-Slavonia. It was the seat of the Orehovečki noble family.

References

Municipalities of Croatia
Populated places in Koprivnica-Križevci County